Don't Let Up is the twelfth studio album by American hard rock band Night Ranger, released on March 24, 2017. It peaked at No. 12 on the Billboard Top Hard Rock Albums chart on June 15, 2017. It is the first Night Ranger studio album to feature Keri Kelli on guitar, who replaced Joel Hoekstra after he left to join Whitesnake.

Track listing
"Somehow Someway" (Jack Blades, Brad Gillis, Kelly Keagy, Keri Kelli) – 4:40
"Running Out of Time" (Blades, Gillis, Keagy) – 4:25
"Truth" (Blades, Gillis, Keagy, Kelli) – 4:26
"Day and Night" (Blades, Gillis, Keagy) – 5:21
"Don't Let Up" (Blades, Gillis, Keagy, Kelli) – 4:19
"(Won't Be Your) Fool Again" (Blades, Gillis, Keagy) – 5:20
"Say What You Want" (Blades, Gillis, Keagy) – 4:16
"We Can Work It Out" (Blades, Gillis, Keagy) – 4:02
"Comfort Me" (Blades, Gillis, Keagy, Kelli) – 5:10
"Jamie" (Blades, Gillis, Keagy) – 3:58
"Nothing Left of Yesterday" (Blades, Gillis, Keagy) – 4:38

Personnel
Jack Blades – bass, vocals
Kelly Keagy – drums, vocals
Brad Gillis – guitars, vocals
Eric Levy – keyboards
Keri Kelli – guitars

References

2017 albums
Night Ranger albums
Frontiers Records albums